Ciao America is a 2002 American-Italian comedy-drama film directed by Frank Ciota.

Cast

Eddie Malavarca as Lorenzo Primavera
Maurizio Nichetti as  Giulio Fellini
Violante Placido as  Paola Angelini
Nathaniel Marston as  Skip Cromwell
Anthony DeSanto as  Frank Mantovani
Giancarlo Giannini as  Zi' Felice
Paul Sorvino as  Antonio Primavera
Vincenzo Amato as Bongo

References

External links 
 

2002 films
English-language Italian films
Italian comedy-drama films
American comedy-drama films
2002 comedy-drama films
2000s English-language films
2000s American films
2000s Italian films